Boenninghausenia is a monotypic plant genus in the family Rutaceae. The sole species is Boenninghausenia albiflora, which occurs in Bhutan, Nepal, Pakistan, Kashmir, India, Indonesia, Philippines,  Myanmar, Thailand, Laos, North Vietnam, China and Japan.

References

Rutoideae
Monotypic Rutaceae genera
Flora of Bhutan
Flora of Nepal